Scott Fields (born September 30, 1960 in Chicago, Illinois) is a guitarist, composer, and bandleader. He is best known for blending music that is composed with music that is written and for his modular pieces (see 48 Motives, 96 Gestures, OZZO, and Seven Deserts). He works primarily in avant-garde jazz, experimental music, and contemporary classical music.

Biography
Fields was born and raised in Chicago, Illinois. He started as a self-taught rock musician but soon was influenced by the musicians of the Association for the Advancement for Creative Musicians (AACM), which was active in the Hyde Park neighborhood in which he grew up. Later he studied classical guitar, jazz guitar, music composition, and music theory. In late 1973 Fields co-founded the avant-garde jazz trio Life Rhythms. When the group disbanded two years later, he played sporadically but soon was institutionalized for an extended period. He quit music almost entirely until 1989.

Since then he has performed and composed actively. His ensembles and partnerships have included such musicians as Marilyn Crispell, Hamid Drake, John Hollenbeck, Joseph Jarman, Myra Melford, Jeff Parker, and Elliott Sharp.

Discography
 Fugu (Geode, 1995)
 48 Motives January 11, 1996 (Cadence, 1996)
 Disaster at Sea An Opera Seria (Music & Arts, 1996)
 Five Frozen Eggs (Music & Arts, 1997)
 Sonotropism with Stephen Dembski (Music & Arts, 1997)
 Denouement (Geode, 1999)
 Hornets Collage with Francois Houle (Nuscope, 2000)
 This That (Accretions, 2001)
 Mamet (Delmark, 2001)
 96 Gestures (CRI, 2001)
 From the Diary of Dog Drexel (Rossbin 2002)
 Song Songs Song with Jeff Parker (Delmark, 2004)
 Christangelfox (482 Music, 2004)
 Beckett (Clean Feed, 2007)
 We Were the Phliks (RogueArt, 2007)
 Drawings (Creative Sources, 2008)
 Music for the Radio Program This American Life (Neos, 2008)
 Scharfefelder with Elliott Sharp (Clean Feed, 2008)
 Bitter Love Songs (Clean Feed, 2008)
 Samuel (New World, 2009)
 What We Talk with Stephan Rath (Neos, 2010)
 Afiadacampos with Elliott Sharp (Neos, 2010)
 Frail Lumber (Not Two, 2011)
 Minaret Minuets with Matthias Schubert (Clean Feed, 2011)
 Everything Is in the Instructions with Jeffrey Lependorf (Ayler, 2013)
 Kintsugi (Between the Lines, 2013)
 Mostly Stick (Between the Lines, 2014)
 Haydn (Between the Lines, 2014)
 Akra-Kampoj with Elliott Sharp (New Atlantis, 2015)
 Journeys Have Destinations of Which the Traveler Is Unaware with Jeffrey Lependorf (Albany, 2015)
 Burning in Water, Drowning in Flame (New Atlantis, 2015)
 Barclay (Ayler, 2018)
 Seven Deserts (New World, 2020)

References

External links 

 Scott Fields website

1956 births
Living people
American jazz guitarists
Cadence Jazz Records artists
Jewish American musicians
Clean Feed Records
Jewish jazz musicians
Guitarists from Chicago
20th-century American guitarists
Jazz musicians from Illinois
Clean Feed Records artists
Music & Arts artists
RogueArt artists
21st-century American Jews